Netherlands participated at the 2015 European Games, in Baku, Azerbaijan from 12 to 28 June 2015.

117 athletes had been selected by the Dutch Olympic Committee to represent the Netherlands.

Medalists

| width="78%" align="left" valign="top" |

| width="22%" align="left" valign="top" |

Archery

The Netherlands has qualified for three quota places in both the men's and the women's archery events at the Games, and as a result has also qualified for the team events.

Basketball

Boxing

Canoeing

Cycling

The Netherlands will participate in road cycling disciplines at the European Games.

Mountain biking
Men

Road 
Men

Women

BMX

Diving

Men

Women

Fencing

Gymnastics

Judo

Netherlands has qualified 12 athletes.

Men

Women

Shooting

Swimming

Women

Table tennis

Netherlands has qualified three athletes for the table tennis events.

Taekwondo

Netherlands has qualified three athletes.

Triathlon

Water polo

Women

Preliminary round

Quarterfinal

Fifth place game

Volleyball

Indoor volleyball
Women's tournament – one team of 14 players
Maret Balkestein-GrothuesYvon BeliënAnne BuijsRobin de KruijfLaura DijkemaNicole KoolhaasNicole Oude LuttikhuisJudith PietersenCeleste PlakMyrthe SchootLonneke SloetjesDebby Stam-PilonQuinta SteenbergenFemke Stoltenborg

Group stage

|}

|}

Quarterfinals

|}

Beach volleyball

Wrestling

Women's freestyle

References

Nations at the 2015 European Games
European Games
2015